The Manchester Gorton by-election of 2 November 1967 was held following the death of Labour MP Konni Zilliacus.

The seat was a safe seat for the Labour Party, having been won by Labour at the 1966 United Kingdom general election with a majority of over 8,000 votes.

Candidates
47-year-old Kenneth Marks for the defending Labour Party was a councillor in Denton
For the Conservatives, 28-year-old Winston S Churchill was a journalist for the Times and the grandson of the late former Prime Minister Sir Winston Churchill.
Terry Lacey was chosen by the local Liberal Party association
59-year-old writer John Creasey nominated himself as candidate for the All Party Alliance he had created.
The Communists chose Victor Eddisford

Result of the previous general election

Result of the by-election

References

1967 in England
1967 elections in the United Kingdom
Gorton
1960s in Greater Manchester
November 1967 events in the United Kingdom